El Arbi Hababi (born 12 August 1967) is a Moroccan former footballer who played at international level, competing at the 1994 FIFA World Cup.

Career statistics

International goals

References

1967 births
Living people
Moroccan footballers
Morocco international footballers
1994 FIFA World Cup players
People from Khouribga
Olympique Club de Khouribga players
Botola players
Association football midfielders